The 2015 Aegon Classic was a women's tennis tournament played on outdoor grass courts. It was the 34th edition of the event, and the second edition of the event as a Premier tournament on the 2015 WTA Tour. It took place at the Edgbaston Priory Club in Birmingham, United Kingdom, on 15–21 June 2015.

Sabine Lisicki set the WTA Tour record for the most aces hit in a women's singles match at this tournament, hitting 27 aces in her second-round win over Belinda Bencic on 17 June 2015.

Points and prize money

Point distribution

Prize money

Singles main draw entrants

Seeds 

 1 Rankings as of June 8, 2015.

Other entrants 
The following players received wildcards into the main draw:
  Eugenie Bouchard
  Naomi Broady
  Jelena Janković
  Johanna Konta
  Katie Swan

The following player received entry using a protected ranking into the main draw:
  Petra Cetkovská

The following players received entry from the qualifying draw:
  Tímea Babos
  Kateryna Bondarenko
  Misaki Doi
  Marina Erakovic
  Klára Koukalová
  Aleksandra Krunić
  Michelle Larcher de Brito
  Tatjana Maria

The following player received entry as a lucky loser:
  Zheng Saisai

Withdrawals 
Before the tournament
  Timea Bacsinszky →replaced by  Tereza Smitková
  Mona Barthel →replaced by  Ajla Tomljanović
  Madison Brengle →replaced by  Monica Niculescu
  Dominika Cibulková →replaced by  Mirjana Lučić-Baroni
  Camila Giorgi (right hip injury) →replaced by  Zheng Saisai
  Madison Keys →replaced by  Kateřina Siniaková
  Peng Shuai →replaced by  Lauren Davis
  Lucie Šafářová →replaced by  Christina McHale
  Yaroslava Shvedova →replaced by  Bojana Jovanovski

During the tournament 
  Victoria Azarenka (left foot injury)

Doubles main draw entrants

Seeds 

1 Rankings as of June 8, 2015.

Other entrants 
The following pairs received wildcards into the doubles main draw:
  Eugenie Bouchard /  Svetlana Kuznetsova
  Simona Halep /  Heather Watson
  Jocelyn Rae /  Anna Smith

Withdrawals
During the tournament
  Simona Halep (right arm strain)
  Kristina Mladenovic (low back injury)

Finals

Singles 

  Angelique Kerber defeated  Karolína Plíšková, 6–7(5–7), 6–3, 7–6(7–4)

Doubles 

  Garbiñe Muguruza /  Carla Suárez Navarro defeated  Andrea Hlaváčková /  Lucie Hradecká, 6–4, 6–4

References 

http://www.lta.org.uk/major-events/aegon-classic-birmingham/aegon-classic-news/

External links 
 Official website

2015 WTA Tour
2015
June 2015 sports events in the United Kingdom
2015 in English tennis